Pea early browning virus (PEBV) is a plant pathogenic virus.

External links
 ICTVdB - The Universal Virus Database: Pea early browning virus
 Family Groups - The Baltimore Method

Viral plant pathogens and diseases
Virgaviridae